Sørskot is a village in the municipality of Steigen in Nordland county, Norway. Sørskot Chapel was built here in 1953.

References

Steigen
Villages in Nordland